Songwriters on Parade was a musical Vaudeville revue which featured hit songwriters of the day.  It was considered one of the last Vaudevillian forays of this type.  Between 1931 and 1940 (at least) various line-ups of popular songwriters would form a sensational act, performing their hits across the eastern seaboard on the Loew's and Keith Circuits.

Partial list of featured songwriters between 1931–1940
 Sidney Clare
 Jack Lawrence
 Al Lewis
 Gerald Marks
 Vincent Rose 
 Walter Samuels
 Jean Schwartz
 Al Sherman
 Abner Silver
 Nat Simon
 Charles Tobias
 Henry Tobias
 Percy Wenrich

Literary sources
 Sherman, Robert B. Walt's Time: from before to beyond.  Chapter 2; "Al's Time", page 95.  Santa Clarita: Camphor Tree Publishers, 1998.

References

Vaudeville
Revues